Knock Knock is an American gift company and book publisher founded by Jen Bilik on January 1, 2002. The company is based in Los Angeles, California. Bilik, previously a book editor, launched Knock Knock in 2002 with the proceeds from the sale of her Manhattan apartment.

In January 2018, Knock Knock acquired Emily McDowell Studio (renamed Em & Friends) and Sisters of Los Angeles (renamed People, Places & Things). The three individual companies are now under one umbrella: the newly formed Los Angeles based Who's There Group.

Products and publications 

In 2007, Knock Knock began publishing humorous nonfiction including  How to Traumatize Your Children: 7 Proven Methods to Help You Screw Up Your Kids Deliberately and with Skill.

References

External links 
 Website

Publishing companies of the United States
Publishing companies established in 1967
Companies based in Los Angeles
Visual arts publishing companies
Book publishing companies based in California
2002 establishments in California